Francisco Garmendia (November 6, 1924 – November 16, 2005) was a bishop of the Catholic Church in the United States . He served as an auxiliary bishop of the Archdiocese of New York from 1977 to 2001.

Biography
Born in Lazcano, Spain, Francisco Garmendia Ayestarán was ordained a priest for the Canons Regular of the Congregation of the Most Holy Saviour of the Lateran on June 29, 1947.  He served as a priest in Argentina before he was incardinated into the Archdiocese of New York in 1975.  Pope Paul VI appointed him as the Titular Bishop of Limisa and Auxiliary Bishop of New York on May 24, 1977.  He was ordained a bishop by Cardinal Terence Cooke on June 29, 1977. The principal co-consecrators were Coadjutor Archbishop John Maguire of New York and Auxiliary Bishop Patrick Ahern.  Garmendia served as the pastor of St. Thomas Aquinas Church in The Bronx and the Vicar for Spanish Pastoral Development.  He was the first Hispanic bishop in New York, and continued to serve as an auxiliary bishop until his resignation was accepted by Pope John Paul II on October 30, 2001.  He died on November 16, 2005, at the age of 81.

The Hope Line 
In 1990, Garmendia co-founded The Hope Line or La Linea de la Esperanza, a non-profit serving the South Bronx community. After the Happyland Fire in March 1990, Garmendia and Mr. James P. McLaughlin, President of United Parcel Service, led an effort to establish community assistance; this started with a bilingual telephone counseling and referral service and has since grown to include a diaper distribution program, a food pantry, a SNAP benefit enrollment office, virtual taxes, financial literacy workshops and referral services.

References

1924 births
2005 deaths
20th-century American Roman Catholic titular bishops
Spanish emigrants to the United States
Spanish expatriates in Argentina
Spanish Roman Catholic bishops in North America
People from Goierri
Basque Roman Catholic priests